Theresa Lola (born 6 May 1994) is a British Nigerian poet and writer. She was joint winner of the 2018 Brunel International African Poetry Prize. In April 2019, she was announced as the 2019 Young People's Laureate for London.

Early life 
Theresa Lola was born in Lagos, Nigeria, and moved to London, England in 2007 when she was 13. In 2015, she graduated with a first-class degree in Accounting and Finance from the University of Hertfordshire.

Career 
After university, Lola took part in the Barbican Young Poets programme. Shortly after she was shortlisted for the 2016 Bridport Poetry Prize, and later won the 2017 Hammer and Tongue National Poetry Slam. In 2018, she was joint winner of the 2018 Brunel International African Poetry Prize. In that same year she was commissioned by the Mayor of London's Office to write and read a poem at the unveiling of Millicent Fawcett's  statue at Parliament Square. A year later, in April 2019, she was announced as the 2019 Young People's Laureate for London. In 2019 Lola's debut full-length poetry collection In Search of Equilibrium was published by Nine Arches Press, described by Pascale Petit as a "glorious hymn to being alive and wounded".

References 

Writers from Lagos
21st-century Nigerian women writers
Nigerian women poets
Alumni of the University of Hertfordshire
1994 births
Living people
Nigerian emigrants to the United Kingdom